Mamadama Bangoura (born November 10, 1993) is a Guinean judoka.

Career
She competed at the 2016 Summer Olympics in the women's 63 kg event, in which she was eliminated by Estefania García in the first round. She was the flag bearer for Guinea at the Parade of Nations.

Mamadama Bangoura did not return to Guinea after the 2016 Summer Olympics in Brazil, having disappeared after leaving a message saying she wanted to "try her luck" abroad.

References

External links
 

1993 births
Living people
Guinean female judoka
Olympic judoka of Guinea
Judoka at the 2016 Summer Olympics
Defectors